Depot Lake is an approximately  long and irregularly shaped lake on the Ingrid-Christensen coast of the Princess Elisabeth Land in East Antarctica.

It is located in the Vestfold Hills where scientists from the Australian National Antarctic Research Expeditions established a depot here in 1978. The Antarctic Names Committee of Australia named the lake Depot Lake in 1983.

Literature 
 John Stewart: Antarctica – An Encyclopedia. Bd. 1, McFarland & Co., Jefferson and London 2011, p. 420

External links 
 Depot Lake on Composite Gazetteer of Antarctica

Ingrid Christensen Coast
Lakes of Princess Elizabeth Land
Wikipedia requested photographs in Antarctica